Yellowbird is a 2014 English-language French–Belgian CG-animated fantasy film. It was directed by Christian De Vita.

The film features the voices of Seth Green, Dakota Fanning, Jim Rash, Yvette Nicole Brown, Christine Baranski, Richard Kind, Danny Glover and Elliott Gould. Additional performances by Brady Corbet and Jamie Denbo.

Plot
Darius (voiced by Danny Glover), the leader of a flock of birds, is wounded just before it is time for the birds to migrate to Africa. Information about how to lead the migration must be passed to the first bird that encounters Darius.That is Yellowbird (Seth Green) who is excited by the challenge but has very little life experience. Karl (voiced by Jim Rash) expected to take over as leader but Yellowbird lies to the flock and leads them south for the migration. He is really only a young hatchling with no experience and endangers the flock many times. Delf (voiced by Dakota Fanning) always supports him in the beginning. He flies north by mistake, landing in Holland and not Spain. The flock then crosses the North Sea and ends up somewhere with snow. Finally Yellowbird tells the truth and it turns out the "Iron Bird" is not to be feared but really is a solution to their problem. They end up taking a plane to Africa. Yellowbird officially becomes part of the flock and everybody celebrates.

Voice cast

References

External links
 
 
 SC Films International official website

2014 films
2014 animated films
2014 3D films
French 3D films
3D animated films
2010s French animated films
Belgian animated films
Animated films about birds
Animated films about orphans
Films scored by Stephen Warbeck
2010s English-language films